Destin Chancel Onka Malonga (16 March 1988 – 31 July 2016) was a Congolese professional footballer who played as a goalkeeper.

Club career
Born in Brazzaville, Congo, Malonga played professionally for MSP Batna in the Algerian Championnat National, before joining AS Contres of the French Division Honneur in 2010. After just one year left the club and signed for AF Lozère.

International career
He made a full international debut for Congo on 14 November 2009 in a friendly against Angola, for his only international appearance.

Coaching career
Besides playing goalkeeper he also coached the Feminine football club Entente Gévaudan.

Personal life
Destin Onka died on 31 July 2016 at Vallon-Pont-d'Arc, Ardèche, France in a canoeing accident during pre-season club training.

References

1988 births
2016 deaths
Sportspeople from Brazzaville
Association football goalkeepers
Republic of the Congo footballers
Republic of the Congo international footballers
Algerian Ligue Professionnelle 1 players
Championnat National 3 players
CSMD Diables Noirs players
ACNFF players
MSP Batna players
Olympique Alès players
Algerian Ligue 2 players
Republic of the Congo expatriate sportspeople in Algeria
Expatriate footballers in Algeria
Republic of the Congo expatriate sportspeople in France
Expatriate footballers in France
Accidental deaths in France
Canoeing deaths